Eulipotyphla, an order of mammals that includes shrews, hedgehogs and solenodons, have recently been discovered to be venomous. Venomous organisms are found across all taxa of life. The most commonly recognized venomous animals includes reptiles, amphibians and cnidarians, though venomous mammals have rarely been described. Emerging around 70 million years ago, Eulipotyphylans have specialized venom delivery systems that aid the animal in searching for and capturing prey.

Venom & eulipotyphylans 
Venom is a key ecological adaptation found across all taxa of life. Venom toxins are produced by specialized tissues that cause physiological changes when delivered to animals through a wound caused by a venom delivery structure. Venom is a trait for which the phenotype (the effects of the toxins) mostly results from very specific interactions between the products of genes and a target organism.

Despite research on various venomous organisms, mammals have rarely been described. Mammalian venom systems are rare and are restricted to members of the orders monotremes, chiropterans, primates, and eulipotyphlans. The order Eulipotyphla consists of the hedgehogs, moles, shrews, and solenodons. Within Eulipotyphla, only four species have been shown to be venomous: the Hispaniolan solenodon (Solenodon paradoxus) and three of 376 species of shrews (Soricidae): Blarina brevicauda, Neomys fodiens and N. anomalus. Their venoms are utilized for distinct ecological purposes, such as male–male combat to facilitate breeding, aiding hematophagy, predation, and potentially defensive or antagonistic purposes.

Members of the order Eulipotphyla utilize their venom for overpowering vertebrate prey much larger than themselves; prey they would otherwise be unable to feed upon.  Eulipotyphylans such as Blarina and Neomys have large body mass and high metabolic rates. They utilize venom for paralyzing invertebrate prey for long-term storage purposes, known as “prey caching”, to provide a food resource to meet their extreme metabolic demands. Further, "prey caching" saves Eulipotyphylans time and energy spent on capturing prey as well as minimizes the risk of predation. In some instances, venom is utilized for intraspecific competition or to facilitate offspring survival. Eulipotyphylan venoms display strong paralytic and hypotensive effects that enable hunting and storage of prey and produce potent hemolysis. Injection of the toxin causes paralysis, irregular respiration, and convulsions in their prey prior to death. Shrew venoms might have evolved not only to paralyze and immobilize prey to make food stores, but also to kill and eat it quickly to meet their high energetic demands. There may be a selective pressure on a trait like venom, which enables these large shrews to collect more prey in order to maintain their high mass and high metabolism. However, there may be metabolic costs of venom production in mammals, possibly explaining the rarity of venom across mammals.

Evolution 
Eulipotyphlan venom systems and their constitutive toxins have evolved on multiple independent occasions via the process of convergent evolution following their divergence during the Late Cretaceous Period. Arising from their non-venomous ancestors, the solenodons, Neomys and Blarina, all evolved venom systems independently and has evolved multiple times within the eulipotyphylan lineage. The solenodon lineage split from the other eulipotyphlans around 80.5 million years ago. The first diversification of the genus, Crocidura (which includes shrews), occurred in Eurasia around 16.5 million years ago. This genus colonized Africa, and later, back colonization led to the diversification of other genus' such as the Mysosorex and Slyvisorex.

Venom injection 
Venom glands are derived traits, also known as apomorphy, that evolved from already differentiated tissues. The delivery of venom from modified salivary glands has two components: the secretion of modified salivary proteins (the venom) and the delivery apparatus (the teeth). The venomous saliva is produced by the submaxillary gland and conducted into the mouth via the submaxillary duct in the mandible. Solenodons have a tubular lower incisor that functions like a hypodermic needle to deliver venom. Shrews, on the other hand, deliver venomous saliva to the victim through punctures with their pointed anterior teeth. Only the solenodon possesses a duct-like tooth as well as salivary venom. Venomous shrews produce copious amounts of saliva, and envenomate their prey by delivering multiple rapid but shallow bites to prey, aiming for the head and neck.

The conserved nature of the genes associated with venom production, or the metavenom network, across amniotes suggests that oral venom systems began with a common gene regulatory foundation and underwent lineage-specific changes to give rise to diverse venom systems in snakes, lizards, and mammals. The metavenom network is significantly enriched for housekeeping genes that are widely conserved across the animal kingdom. These housekeeping genes are involved in various processes, the most significant being the UPR and ERAD pathways. While toxin genes are evolutionarily flexible, the conserved genes they interact with reveal the origins and repeated evolution of venom systems in vertebrates. While snakes have diversified their venom systems using an array of toxins, eulipotyphylans have developed less complex venom systems with high similarity to saliva. The development of these similar traits using common molecular building blocks suggests parallel evolution of venom in these two orders.

Protein content 
Solenodon venom is primarily composed of kallikrein-1-like serine proteases, and while some of these KLK1-like proteins are also found in solenodon saliva, they are of much higher abundance in their venom. Kallikrein-like serine proteases are expressed in multiple tissues and are especially abundant in the saliva of many amniotes. Kallikrein proteolytic activity releases bradykinin and promotes inflammation. When injected, salivary kallikreins from nonvenomous animals, such as mice and rats, induce a hypotensive crisis, leading to death. Mammalian oral venoms, such as the eulipitophylans, all employ kallikrein-like serine protease overexpression. Solenodon KLK1 venom genes have arisen as the result of lineage-specific gene duplication events, rather than duplications occurring prior to the diversification of eulipotyphlans, thereby indicating independent venom-related diversifications in solenodons and shrews. While toxins are beneficial in Eulipotyphylan's ability to capture prey, the bioactivity of the toxins may cause physiological imbalance due to the toxin mimicking endogenous body proteins. For example, the toxins produced by Blarina shrews mimic the kallikrein proteins involved in various proteins cascades and overall homeostasis.

References 

Venomous mammals